Westports Malaysia Sdn Bhd (formerly known as Kelang Multi Terminal Sdn Bhd) is a multi-cargo terminal located on Pulau Indah, Port Klang, Malaysia which is accessible by road via Pulau Indah Expressway, connecting to the KESAS Highway. On 1 October 2013, Pulau Indah was directly connected to the Malaysian Administrative Capital, Putrajaya via the South Klang Valley Expressway.

Westports handles all types of cargoes in containers, breakbulk, dry bulk, liquid bulk, vehicles (roll-on roll-off) and other conventional cargoes. Located along the straits of Malacca, Westports, collectively with Northport as Port Klang, has become the 18th busiest seaport in the world.

History 
During privatisation by the government of Malaysia in the early 1990s, Port Klang was subdivided into 3 terminals which are now known as Northport, Southpoint and Westports.

Starting out as Kelang Multi Terminal Sdn Bhd in 1994, renamed as Westport Sdn Bhd since 1997 and now known as Westports Malaysia Sdn Bhd, the seaport terminal have played a leading role in Malaysia's efforts to provide storage, bunkering, cargo/freight handling and other port related facilities which add to Malaysia's importance as a link in the global maritime trade.

Located on the island of Pulau Indah (formerly Pulau Lumut), Westports have transformed the island's natural swamplands and sands into a multi-cargo seaport terminal. With the current quay length of 3.2 kilometers, which includes 5 container terminals, Westports are able to handle up to 7.5 million TEUs yearly, with the potential to expand to a further 4 container terminals which would give a total capacity of 15 million TEUs.

Ruben Gnanalingam is the company's CEO.

Port Services

Overview 

Container
Container operations is the core business of Westports.

Facilities 

Container Terminal
 Berth length 11 berths (16 meter depth)| 3200 meters
 Terminal capacity  out of total built up area of  | 7.2 million TEU capacity per year
 CT 1 - 
 CT 2 - 
 CT 3 - 
 CT 4 - 
 CT 5 - 
 Equipments
 45 Quay Cranes (QC)
 115 Rubber Tyred Gantrys (RTG)
 273 Prime Movers (PM)
 25 Reach Stackers
 1,236 Refrigerated Points (Reefers)
 25,036 Total Ground Slots

Award 
2010 - July Asia HRD Congress Award

External links 
 Official site

References

1994 establishments in Malaysia
Klang District
Ports and harbours of Malaysia